S. Rajendra Babu (born 1 June 1939) was the 34th chief Justice of India. He also served as the chairperson of National Human Rights Commission of India.

Biography 
S. Rajendra Babu was born in Bangalore, on 1 June 1939. He pursued his LLB from Raja Lakhamagouda Law College, Belgaum Karnataka University.

Professional career 
Babu was appointed permanent Judge of the Karnataka High Court in February 1988. He was appointed as a Judge of the Supreme Court of India on 25 September 1997. On 2 May 2004, as the senior-most Puisne judge of the supreme court, he succeeded Justice V. N. Khare as Chief Justice of India. His tenure lasted less than a month, as he retired on 1 June 2004, upon his 65th birthday.

During his tenure in the Supreme Court, Babu delivered several landmark judgments in civil law, criminal law, constitutional law, environmental law, taxation, corporate law and intellectual property matters. Babu analysed the mob psychology in the case relating to anti-Sikh riots, following the assassination of Indira Gandhi. He also interpreted the provisions of the Muslim Women (Protection of Rights on Divorce) Act, 1986.

Babu assumed the office of Chairperson of National Human Rights Commission on 2 April 2007 and held tenure until 31 May 2009. He is the fifth Chairperson of the Commission.

Post judicial career 
Babu presently hold (2014) the ICICI Chair (Professor) at the National Law School of India University. Deeply interested in Vedanta, Babu has been imparting training in community health work as the President of International Nursing Services Association for over 25 years.

Honours
Babu was conferred with an honorary doctorate by his alma mater, Karnataka University, in 2005.

References

External links
Official Website of The National Human Rights Commission of India

Chief justices of India
Scholars from Bangalore
1939 births
Living people
Judges of the Karnataka High Court
20th-century Indian judges
21st-century Indian lawyers
20th-century Indian lawyers
Karnatak University alumni
21st-century Indian judges